Little Soldier is a children's novel by Bernard Ashley, published in 1999. It was shortlisted for the Carnegie Medal and 2000 for the Guardian Children's Fiction Prize.

Plot summary
Kaninda, who escaped when his family was gunned down in their own home in Africa, is now in London.  He longs to escape back to his country of Lasai so that he can avenge his family. Meanwhile, on the streets of London another form of tribal warfare - gang warfare - threatens to draw him in.

Footnotes

1999 British novels
British children's novels
Novels about orphans
Novels set in London
1999 children's books
Orchard Books books